Rouzier is a surname. Notable people with the surname include:
 Antonin Rouzier (born 1986), French volleyball player
 Daniel Rouzier (born 1960), Haitian tycoon
 Fabrice Rouzier (born 1967), Haitian pianist, producer, and entrepreneur

See also 
 Rouziers, Cantal, France
 Rouziers-de-Touraine, Indre-et-Loire, France